The Traverse City Railroad was the owner of a branch railroad from Walton Junction, Michigan, to Traverse City. The line was built in 1872, and connected with the Grand Rapids and Indiana Railway, to which it was sold in 1917.

References

Defunct Michigan railroads
Predecessors of the Pennsylvania Railroad
Railway companies established in 1871
Railway companies disestablished in 1917